The Adolphe-Poisson Bay is a freshwater body located south of the southwestern part of the Gouin Reservoir, in the
territory of the town of La Tuque, in the administrative region of Mauricie, in the province of Quebec, in Canada.

This lake extends almost entirely in Poisson Township (southern part), except for the strait passing to the northeast of the large island blocking the mouth of the bay which is situated in the canton of Hanotaux.

Recreotourism activities are the main economic activity of the sector. Forestry comes second.

The Forest Road R1009 passes on the west side of Adolphe-Poisson Bay and also serves the lower Flapjack River, passing through the northern part of Bignell Creek and the southern part of the Bureau Lake (Gouin Reservoir). This R1009 road joins the Southeast route 404 which serves the northern part of the Canadian National Railway.

The surface of Adolphe-Poisson Bay is usually frozen from mid-November to the end of April, however, safe ice circulation is generally from early December to late March.

Geography

Toponymy
This hydronym evokes the work of life of Adolphe Poisson (1849-1922), born and baptized under the names of "Modeste-Jules-Adolphe", in Gentilly, Quebec; today, this town is in the city of Bécancour). Poisson was admitted to the Quebec Bar in 1873. Monseigneur Camille Roy (1940) writes that Poisson was "an official at Arthabaska, (now an area of the city of Victoriaville) where since 1874 he has been a member of use of receiver at registration...". Poisson publishes poems and tales in various newspapers and publishes four collections of French poetry:
"Chants canadiens à l'occasion du 24 juin 1880" (English: "Canadian songs on the occasion of June 24, 1880") (1880);
"Heures perdues" (English: "Hours lost") (1894);
"Sous les pins" (English: "Under the Pines") (1902);
"Chants du soir" (English: "Evening Songs") (1917).

A commemorative plaque was installed in Victoriaville in his honor.

The toponym "Baie Adolphe-Poisson" was formalized on March 10, 1970, by the Commission de toponymie du Québec, when it was created.

Notes and references

See also 

Bays of Quebec
La Tuque, Quebec